Uston Nawawi (born 6 September 1978 in Sidoarjo, East Java, Indonesia) is a retired Indonesian footballer who last played as a midfielder for Deltras Sidoarjo. He is former player of the Indonesia national team. His cousin, Rendy Irawan, is also a football player.

Honours

Club 
Persebaya Surabaya
Winner
 Liga Indonesia Premier Division (2): 1996–97, 2004
 Liga Indonesia First Division: 2006

Persisam Putra Samarinda
Winner
 Liga Indonesia Premier Division: 2008–09

Persebaya DU (Bhayangkara)
Winner
 Liga Indonesia Premier Division: 2013

Country 
Indonesia
Winner
 Indonesian Independence Cup: 2000
 Southeast Asian Games Silver Medal: 1997
 Southeast Asian Games Bronze Medal: 1999

International goals

References 

1977 births
Living people
Indonesian footballers
Indonesia international footballers
Javanese people
Persebaya Surabaya players
PSPS Pekanbaru players
Persisam Putra Samarinda players
Persidafon Dafonsoro players
Gresik United players
Association football midfielders
Southeast Asian Games bronze medalists for Indonesia
Southeast Asian Games medalists in football
Competitors at the 1997 Southeast Asian Games
Competitors at the 1999 Southeast Asian Games
People from Sidoarjo Regency
Sportspeople from East Java